Steny Hamilton Hoyer (born June 14, 1939) is an American politician and attorney serving as the U.S. representative for  since 1981 and as the House Majority Leader from 2007 to 2011 and from 2019 to 2023. A Democrat, Hoyer was first elected in a special election on May 19, 1981. As of 2023, he is in his 22nd House term. His district includes a large swath of rural and suburban territory southeast of Washington, D.C. Hoyer is the dean of the Maryland congressional delegation and the most senior Democrat in the House.

From 2003 to 2023, Hoyer was the second-ranking Democrat in the House of Representatives behind Nancy Pelosi. He is a two-time House majority leader, having served in the post from 2007 to 2011 under Speaker Pelosi. During two periods of Republican House control (2003–2007 and 2011–2019), Hoyer served as House minority whip, both times under Minority Leader Pelosi. Following the 2018 midterm elections in which the Democrats took control of the House, Hoyer was reelected majority leader in 2019 for the 116th Congress; he remained the number two House Democrat behind Speaker Pelosi. He announced on November 17, 2022, that he, along with Pelosi, would not seek a leadership position in the 118th Congress, though he would remain a member of the House.

Early life and education
Hoyer was born in New York City but grew up in Mitchellville, Maryland, the son of Jean (née Baldwin) and Steen Theilgaard Høyer. His father was Danish and a native of Copenhagen; "Steny" is a variant of his father's name, "Steen". His mother was an American with Scottish, German, and English ancestry and a descendant of John Hart, a signer of the Declaration of Independence. He graduated from Suitland High School in Suitland, Maryland.

In his early years at the University of Maryland College Park, Hoyer held a 1.9 grade point average. His attitude toward school and politics changed after he heard a speech by then Senator John F. Kennedy in 1960. In 1963, Hoyer received his B.A. degree magna cum laude and graduated Omicron Delta Kappa from the University of Maryland, College Park. He was a member of the Sigma Chi fraternity. He earned his J.D. degree from Georgetown University Law Center in 1966.

Early political career
From 1962 to 1966, Hoyer was a member of the staff of U.S. Senator Daniel Brewster; also on Brewster's staff at that time was Nancy Pelosi.

In 1966, Hoyer won a newly created seat in the Maryland State Senate, representing Prince George's County–based Senate district 4C. The district, created in the aftermath of Reynolds v. Sims, was renumbered as the 26th in 1975, the same year that Hoyer was elected president of the Maryland State Senate, the youngest in state history.

From 1969 to 1971, Hoyer served as the first vice president of the Young Democrats of America.

In 1978, Hoyer sought the Democratic nomination for lieutenant governor of Maryland as the running mate of then acting Governor Blair Lee III, but lost to Samuel Bogley, 37%–34%. The same year, Hoyer was appointed to the Maryland Board of Higher Education, a position he held until 1981.

U.S. House of Representatives

Elections
Fifth district Congresswoman Gladys Spellman fell into a coma shortly before the 1980 election. She was reelected, but it soon became apparent that she would never regain consciousness, and Congress declared her seat vacant by resolution in February 1981. Hoyer narrowly won a crowded seven-way Democratic primary, beating Spellman's husband, Reuben, by only 1,600 votes. He defeated a better-funded Republican, Audrey Scott, in the May 19 special election. 56%–44%, earning himself the nickname "boy wonder". In the 1982 general election, Hoyer was reelected to a full term with 80% of the vote. He has faced only one relatively close contest since then, when he defeated future Governor of Maryland Larry Hogan with 53% of the vote in 1992. His second-lowest margin of victory was his 1996 race against Republican State Delegate John Morgan, when he received 57% of the vote. Hoyer has been reelected 14 times with no substantive opposition and is the longest-serving House member ever from southern Maryland.

Tenure

Domestic issues
Hoyer supports and has led the Make It In America plan linking the domestic manufacturing industry and overall U.S. economic success.

Hoyer is pro-choice on abortion rights. He voted against the Partial-Birth Abortion Ban Act in 2003. (However, at the height of national polarization after the Supreme Court's intention to overturn Roe v. Wade leaked, Hoyer controversially endorsed an anti-abortion incumbent House member over his pro-choice primary challenger.) Hoyer supports affirmative action and LGBT rights. He is rated F by the NRA, indicating a pro-gun-control voting record.

In 2008, Hoyer said he opposed providing immunity to telecom companies, but then negotiated a bill, which Senators Patrick Leahy and Russ Feingold called a "capitulation", that would provide immunity to any telecom company that had been told by the George W. Bush administration that its actions were legal. "No matter how they spin it, this is still immunity", said Kevin Bankston, a senior lawyer for the Electronic Frontier Foundation, a privacy rights group that sued over Bush's wiretapping program. "It's not compromise, it's pure theater."

In June 2010, Hoyer brought up the idea that Congress could temporarily extend middle-class tax cuts set to expire at the end of the year, suggesting that making them permanent would cost too much. President Obama wanted to extend them permanently for people making less than $200,000 a year and families making less than $250,000.

Hoyer voted against the impeachment of President Bill Clinton in 1999. In 2019, he voted to impeach President Donald Trump. In 2021, Hoyer voted for Trump's second impeachment.

In February 2021, Hoyer made a passionate speech in Congress that has been viewed online more than two million times, criticizing a Facebook post by U.S. Representative Marjorie Taylor Greene. The post featured a gun-toting Greene next to three members of the "Squad"—Representatives Ilhan Omar, Alexandria Ocasio-Cortez, and Rashida Tlaib—with the caption "Democrats' Worst Nightmare". In his speech, Hoyer compared Greene's words with those of Representative Steve King, who was removed from the Judiciary and Agriculture Committees in 2019 after comments he made to The New York Times questioning why white supremacy was considered offensive. Hoyer said that Greene's words in both that post and others she had made promoting baseless conspiracy theories were far more offensive and incendiary than the comment that led Republicans to strip King of his committee roles. He asked his colleagues to on both sides of the aisle to "do the decent thing" and strip Greene of her committee roles. The vote succeeded, with 11 Republicans joining Democrats to pass the motion to remove.

Foreign issues
Hoyer supports civilian nuclear cooperation with India.

Hoyer initially supported the Iraq War and was recognized by the DLC for his vocal leadership on this issue. After the war became publicly unpopular, he said he favored a "responsible redeployment". But he repeatedly supported legislation to continue funding the war without deadlines for troop withdrawal, most recently in return for increased funding of domestic projects.

Hoyer is a supporter of Israel, and has often been allied with American Israel Public Affairs Committee (AIPAC). In September 2007, he criticized Representative Jim Moran for suggesting that AIPAC "has pushed [the Iraq] war from the beginning", calling the comment "factually inaccurate". In January 2017, Hoyer voted for a House resolution condemning UN Security Council Resolution 2334, which called Israeli settlement building in the occupied Palestinian territories a flagrant violation of international law and a major obstacle to peace. He supported President Trump's decision to recognize Jerusalem as Israel's capital.

Hoyer has said that a nuclear Iran is "unacceptable" and that the use of force remains an option.

In January 2019, Hoyer opposed Trump's planned withdrawal of U.S. troops from Syria and Afghanistan as "impulsive, irresponsible, and dangerous". He supports former President Obama's call for authorizing limited but decisive military action in response to the Assad regime's alleged use of chemical weapons.

Hoyer is a former chair of the Commission on Security and Cooperation in Europe.

Legislation
On February 28, 2014, Hoyer introduced the bill to amend the National Law Enforcement Museum Act to extend the termination date (H.R. 4120; 113th Congress). The bill would extend until November 9, 2016, the authority of the National Law Enforcement Officers Memorial Fund, a nonprofit organization, to construct a museum on federal lands in the District of Columbia honoring law enforcement officers.

Fundraising
Hoyer is a prolific fundraiser for House Democrats. He has been the top giver to fellow party members in the House. In the 2008 election cycle, he contributed more than $1 million to the party and individual candidates as of July 14, 2008.

Party leadership

Hoyer served as chair of the Democratic Caucus, the fourth-ranking position among House Democrats, from 1989 to 1994; the former co-chair (and a current member) of the Democratic Steering Committee; and as the chief candidate recruiter for House Democrats from 1995 to 2000. He also served as Deputy Majority Whip from 1987 to 1989.

When David E. Bonior resigned as minority whip in early 2002, Hoyer ran but lost to Nancy Pelosi. After the 2002 midterm elections, Pelosi ran to succeed Dick Gephardt as minority leader, leaving the minority whip post open again. On November 14, 2002, Hoyer's colleagues in the Democratic Caucus unanimously elected him minority whip, the second-highest-ranking position among House Democrats.

Pelosi became the Speaker of the House in January 2007. Hoyer was elected by his colleagues to be House Majority Leader for the 110th Congress, defeating John Murtha of Pennsylvania by a vote of 149–86 within the caucus, despite Pelosi endorsing Murtha. Hoyer is the first Marylander to become Majority Leader and became the highest-ranking federal lawmaker in Maryland history. In this post, Hoyer was the House Democrats' floor leader and ranked second in the leadership, after the Speaker.

The day after the 2010 midterm elections, in which the Democrats lost control of the House, Hoyer had a private conversation with Pelosi and said he would not challenge her for minority leader). He ran for minority whip, but was challenged by outgoing Majority Whip Jim Clyburn (the top House Democrats wanted to remain in the leadership, but the minority party in the House has one less position). Hoyer is moderate while Pelosi and Clyburn are more liberal, and a significant number of Hoyer's would-be supporters in the House who were moderate and conservative Democrats had been defeated for reelection. The Congressional Black Caucus backed Clyburn, while 30 House Democrats have supported Hoyer. Hoyer received further support from outgoing Foreign Affairs Committee Chairman Howard L. Berman, Financial Services Committee Chairman Barney Frank, and outgoing Energy and Commerce Committee Chairman Henry A. Waxman Pelosi intervened in the contest by supporting Hoyer as Minority Whip, while creating an "Assistant Leader" position for Clyburn, which would keep him as the third-ranking Democrat in the House behind Pelosi and Hoyer (the existing "Assistant to the Leader" post formerly held by Chris Van Hollen is not officially part of the House leadership and was directly appointed by the Minority Leader).

Hoyer and the DCCC have been criticized for picking their preferred candidates through an undemocratic process. In 2018, it was reported that Hoyer sought to influence the primary race in Colorado's 6th congressional district. He was recorded urging progressive candidate Levi Tillemann to drop out of the race. Hoyer acknowledged that the DCCC had already identified its preferred candidate and discouraged a candid discussion about his weaknesses. On November 28, 2018, Hoyer was selected to return as House Majority Leader.

Electoral history

! Year
! Office
! Election
!
! Subject
! Party
! Votes
! %
!
! Opponent
! Party
! Votes
! %
!
! Opponent
! Party
! Votes
! %
!
! Opponent
! Party
! Votes
! %
|-
|1981
|Congress, 5th district
|Special
||
|  |Steny Hoyer
| |Democratic
| |42,573
| |55.81
|
| |Audrey Scott
| |Republican
| |33,708
| |44.19
|
|
|
|
|
|
|
|
|
|
|-
|1982
|Congress, 5th district
|General
||
| |Steny Hoyer
| |Democratic
| |83,937
| |79.58
|
| |William Guthrie
| |Republican
| |21,533
| |20.42
|
|
|
|
|
|
|
|
|
|
|-
|1984
|Congress, 5th district
|General
||
| |Steny Hoyer
| |Democratic
| |116,310
| |72.18
|
| |John Ritchie
| |Republican
| |44,839
| |27.82
|
|
|
|
|
|
|
|
|
|
|-
|1986
|Congress, 5th district
|General
||
| |Steny Hoyer
| |Democratic
| |82,098
| |81.93
|
| |John Sellner
| |Republican
| |18,102
| |18.07
|
|
|
|
|
|
|
|
|
|
|-
|1988
|Congress, 5th district
|General
||
| |Steny Hoyer
| |Democratic
| |128,437
| |78.63
|
| |John Sellner
| |Republican
| |34,909
| |21.37
|
|
|
|
|
|
|
|
|
|
|-
|1990
|Congress, 5th district
|General
||
| |Steny Hoyer
| |Democratic
| |84,747
| |80.66
|
| |Lee Breuer
| |Republican
| |20,314
| |19.34
|
|
|
|
|
|
|
|
|
|
|-
|1992
|Congress, 5th district
|General
||
| |Steny Hoyer
| |Democratic
| |113,280
| |55.0
|
| |Larry J. Hogan, Jr.
| |Republican
| |92,636
| |45.0
|
|
|
|
|
|
|
|
|
|
|-
|1994
|Congress, 5th district
|General
||
| |Steny Hoyer
| |Democratic
| |98,821
| |58.81
|
| |Donald Devine
| |Republican
| |69,211
| |41.19
|
|
|
|
|
|
|
|
|
|
|-
|1996
|Congress, 5th district
|General
||
| |Steny Hoyer
| |Democratic
| |121,288
| |56.92
|
| |John S. Morgan
| |Republican
| |91,806
| |43.08
|
|
|
|
|
|
|
|
|
|
|-
|1998
|Congress, 5th district
|General
||
| |Steny Hoyer
| |Democratic
| |126,792
| |65.37
|
| |Robert Ostrom
| |Republican
| |67,176
| |34.36
|
|
|
|
|
|
|
|
|
|
|-
|2000
|Congress, 5th district
|General
||
| |Steny Hoyer
| |Democratic
| |166,231
| |65.09
|
| |Thomas Hutchins
| |Republican
| |89,019
| |34.86
|
|
|
|
|
|
|
|
|
|
|-
|2002
|Congress, 5th district
|General
||
| |Steny Hoyer
| |Democratic
| |137,903
| |69.27
|
| |Joseph Crawford
| |Republican
| |60,758
| |30.52
|
|
|
|
|
|
|
|
|
|
|-
|2004
|Congress, 5th district
|General
||
| |Steny Hoyer
| |Democratic
| |204,867
| |68.67
|
| |Brad Jewitt
| |Republican
| |87,189
| |29.93
|
| |Bob Auerbach
| |Green
| |4,224
| |1.42
|
|
|
|
|
|-
|2006
|Congress, 5th district
|General
||
| |Steny Hoyer
| |Democratic
| |168,114
| |82.69
|
| |Steve Warner
| |Green
| |33,464
| |16.46
|
|Write Ins: P.Kuhnert and Other
|| 635
||1,110
||0.86
|
|
|
|
|
|-
|2008
|Congress, 5th district
|General
||
| |Steny Hoyer
| |Democratic
| |253,854
| |73.6
|
| |Collins Bailey
| |Republican
| |82,631
| |24.0
|
| |Darlene Nicholas
| |Libertarian
| |7,829
| |2.3
|
|
|
|
|
|-
|2010
|Congress, 5th district
|General
||
| |Steny Hoyer
| |Democratic
| |143,620
| |64.3
|
| |Charles Lollar
| |Republican
| |79,122
| |35.6
|
| |H. Gavin Shickle
| |Libertarian
| |2,399
| |1.1
|
|
|
|
|
|-
|2012
|Congress, 5th district
|General
||
| |Steny Hoyer
| |Democratic
| |238,618
| |69.4
|
| |Tony O'Donnell
| |Republican
| |95,271
| |27.7
|
| |Bob Auerbach
| |Green
| |5,040
| |1.5
|
| |Arvin Vohra
| |Libertarian
| |4,503
| |1.3
|-
|2014
|Congress, 5th district
|General
||
| |Steny Hoyer
| |Democratic
| |144,725
| |64.0
|
| |Chris Chafee
| |Republican
| |80,752
| |35.7
|
|Write-ins
|
|563
|0.2
|
|
|
|
|
|-
|2016
|Congress, 5th district
|General
||
| |Steny Hoyer
| |Democratic
| |242,989
| |67.4
|
| |Mark Arness
| |Republican
| |105,931
| |29.4
|
| |Jason Summers
| |Libertarian
| |11,078
| |3.1
|
|Write-ins
|
|606
|0.2
|-
|2018
|Congress, 5th district
|General
||
| |Steny Hoyer
| |Democratic
| |213,796	
| |70.3
|
| |William Devine III
| |Republican
| |82,361	
| |27.1
|
| |Patrick Elder
| |Green
| |4,082
| |1.3
|
|Write-ins
|
|279
|0.1
|-
|2020
|Congress, 5th district
|General
||
| |Steny Hoyer
| |Democratic
| |274,210
| |68.8
|
| |Chris Palombi
| |Republican
| |123,525
| |31.0
|
|write-ins
|
|1,104
|0.3
|
|
|
|
|

|-
|2022
|Congress, 5th district
|General
||
| |Steny Hoyer
| |Democratic
| |182,478	
| |65.9
|
| |Chris Palombi
| |Republican
| |94,000
| |33.9
|
|write-ins
|
|442
|0.2
|
|
|
|
|

Personal life

Hoyer has three daughters from his marriage to Judy Pickett Hoyer, who died of cancer in February 1997. In June 2012, after Hoyer announced his support of same-sex marriage, his daughter Stefany Hoyer Hemmer came out as a lesbian in an interview with the Washington Blade.

Judy Hoyer was an advocate of early childhood education, and child development learning centers in Maryland have been named in her honor ("Judy Centers"). She also suffered from epilepsy, and the Epilepsy Foundation of America sponsors an annual public lecture in her name. Steny Hoyer, too, has been an advocate for research in this area, and in 2002 the Epilepsy Foundation gave him its Congressional Leadership Award.

Hoyer serves on the board of trustees for St. Mary's College of Maryland and is a member of the board of the International Foundation for Electoral Systems, a nonprofit that supports international elections. He is also an Advisory Board Member for the Center for the Study of Democracy.

Hoyer is a member of a Baptist church.

References

External links

Congressman Steny Hoyer official U.S. House website
Office of the Majority Leader Steny Hoyer

|-

|-

|-

|-

|-

|-

|-

|-

|-

|-

|-

1939 births
21st-century American politicians
American people of Danish descent
American people of English descent
American people of German descent
American people of Scottish descent
Democratic Party members of the United States House of Representatives from Maryland
Majority leaders of the United States House of Representatives
Georgetown University Law Center alumni
Living people
Maryland lawyers
Democratic Party Maryland state senators
People from Mitchellville, Maryland
People from St. Mary's County, Maryland
Politicians from New York City
Presidents of the Maryland State Senate
St. Mary's College of Maryland
University of Maryland, College Park alumni